Ethmia joviella is a moth in the family Depressariidae. It is found on the Caribbean islands of Dominica and Grenada.

The ground color of the forewings is white, the costal area broadly dusted with brownish gray. The markings are black. The ground color of the hindwings is gray-brown. Adults are on wing in February, March and July in Dominica. There are multiple generations per year.

References

Moths described in 1897
joviella